Limonium lobinii is a species of flowering plants of the family Plumbaginaceae. The species is endemic to Cape Verde. It is listed as an endangered species by the IUCN. The species was first described by Norbert Kilian and Teresa Leyens in 1994. Its local name is carqueja-de-Santiago.

Distribution and ecology
Limonium braunii is restricted to Serra Malagueta in the island of Santiago.

References

Further reading
Wolfram Lobin, Teresa Leyens, Norbert Kilian, Matthias Erben, Klaus Lewejohann, The Genus Limonium (Plumbaginaceae) on the Cape Verde Islands, W Africa, Willdenowia, Berli), vol. 25, no. 1, 20 June 1994, p. 197-214

lobinii
Flora of Santiago, Cape Verde
Endemic flora of Cape Verde